Ajingare  is a City of Sankhar in Chapakot of Syangja District of Gandaki Province in Nepal. According to the 2011 Nepal census, it had a total population of 450.

References

External links 
Mero Syangja
Chapakot Municipality
District Coordination Committee Office, Syangja, Nepal

Syangja District
Populated places in Syangja District